Cole Mohr (born April 27, 1986) is an American model from Houston, Texas, signed with Request Model Management.

He is notable for modeling for Dior Homme, H&M, Burberry, Valentino, Barneys,  Costume National, Marc Jacobs, Levi's, Tommy Hilfiger, and Andrew Buckler. He has appeared in editorials for Vogue Italia and Japanese Men's Vogue, Dazed & Confused, Tush, GQ, L'Officiel Hommes, i-D, and W Magazine.

Mohr has multiple tattoos, including an "AprilMayJune" tattoo across his chest.

He is one of Hedi Slimane's favorite models to photograph. Mohr was the face of Alexander Wang's fall 2007 ad campaign.

Mohr was named a top 10 male model of 2009 by Forbes Magazine.

References

1986 births
Male models from Texas
Living people
People from Houston
Bellaire High School (Bellaire, Texas) alumni